The 1990–91 Football League Cup (known as the Rumbelows Cup for sponsorship reasons) was the 31st season of the Football League Cup, a knockout competition for England's top 92 association football clubs.

The competition began on 27 August 1990, and ended with the final on 21 April 1991 at the Old Wembley Stadium. The cup was won by Sheffield Wednesday, who beat Manchester United 1–0 in the final. A single goal from John Sheridan gave Wednesday the title.

The 1990-91 League Cup remains the last time that one of English football's major honours was won by a team outside the top flight, as winners Sheffield Wednesday were in the second division at the time.

First round

First leg

Second leg

Second round

First leg

Second leg

Third round

Ties

Replays

Fourth round

Ties

Replay

Fifth Round

Ties

Replays

Semi-finals
Sheffield Wednesday moved closer to their first major trophy in more than 50 years with a comfortably victory over Chelsea, while Manchester United edged out Leeds United to book their place at Wembley for a clash against a side managed by their former boss Ron Atkinson.

First leg

Second leg

Manchester United won 3–1 on aggregate.

Sheffield Wednesday won 5–1 on aggregate.

Final

References

General

Specific

External links
Official Carling Cup website

EFL Cup seasons
1990–91 domestic association football cups
Lea
Cup